The 2012 CHIO Aachen was the 2012 edition of the CHIO Aachen, the German official horse show in five horse sport disciplines (show jumping, dressage, eventing, four-in-hand-driving and vaulting).

Introduction 
The 2012 CHIO Aachen is held as CSIO 5* (show jumping), CDIO 5* (dressage), CICO 3* (eventing), CAIO (four-in-hand-driving) and CVIO 3* (vaulting). The event is held between June 29, 2012 and July 8, 2012.

The CHIO Aachen is in show jumping and dressage often called as the most prestigious horse show in Europe. It is also called "Weltfest der Pferdesports" (World Equestrian Festival). The competitions are held at different places at the Soers in Aachen. The show jumping competitions are held in the "Hauptstadion" of the CHIO Aachen, the dressage event are held in the "Deutsche Bank Stadion" and the vaulting competitions are held in the "Albert-Vahle-Halle".

The first horse show were held 1924 in Aachen, together with a horse race. In 1927 the horse show lasted six days. The first show jumping Nations Cup was held here in 1929. Since 2007, influenced by the World Equestrian Games 2006 in Aachen, also eventing and vaulting are disciplines of the CHIO Aachen. In 2012 the eventing Nations Cup is first time part of the new FEI Nations Cup Eventing.

Nations Cup of Germany (vaulting) 
The 2012 vaulting Nations Cup of Germany was part of the 2012 CHIO Aachen and was held Sunday, July 1. It was a combined competition of three Freestyle vaulting competitions (single vaulting – Men, single vaulting – Women and team vaulting). Unlike the other disciplines nations could start with more than one team.
(Top 4 of 8 teams)

Prize of Europe (show jumping) 
The "Preis von Europa" (Prize of Europe), a competition held since 1960, was the first main competition in show jumping at the 2012 CHIO Aachen. The sponsor of this competition was the Warsteiner Brewery. It was held on Wednesday, July 4, 2012 at 2:15 pm. The competition was a show jumping competition with one round and one jump-off, the height of the fences were up to 1.55 meters. The Prize of Europe was endowed with 60,300 €.

As in much competitions in this year (for example the Grand Prixs of La Baule and Hamburg), the name of the winner of this competition is Nick Skelton. He, riding the 9-year-old stallion Big Star, was the fastest faultless rider in a jump-off with 12 riders.

(Top 5 of 55 Competitors)

Grand Prix de Dressage / Nations Cup of Germany (dressage) 
The 2012 dressage Nations Cup of Germany was part of the 2012 CHIO Aachen. Each team consist of three or four team riders, three results of each team count for the Nations Cup ranking. Because the Olympic Games in London, which start only three weeks after the CHIO Aachen, much nations did not start with their top teams. The German team with all four riders that are likely to start in London, win the competition.

The sponsor of the Grand Prix de Dressage was Tesch Inkasso, the dressage Nations Cup ranking was sponsored by the Lambertz-Group.

Team result 

(grey penalties points do not count for the team result)

Individual result 

(top 5 of 36 competitors)

FEI Nations Cup of Germany (show jumping) 
The 2012 FEI Nations Cup of Germany in show jumping was part of the 2012 CHIO Aachen. It was the fifth competition of the 2012 FEI Nations Cup.

The 2012 FEI Nations Cup of Germany was held on Thursday, July 5, 2012 at 7:30 pm (second round under floodlight). The competing teams are: Sweden, Switzerland, Germany, France, Belgium, the Netherlands, Great Britain and Ireland.

The competition was a show jumping competition with two rounds and optionally one jump-off. The height of the fences were up to 1.60 meters. The Nations Cup was endowed with 250,000 €. Mercedes-Benz is the sponsor of this competition.

(grey penalties points do not count for the team result)

Grand Prix Spécial (dressage) 
The Grand Prix Spécial was one of the most important dressage competitions at the 2012 CHIO Aachen. A Grand Prix Spécial is the competition with the highest definite level of dressage competitions.

It was held on Saturday, July 7, 2012 at 8:30 am. The Meggle AG was the sponsor of this competition.

(top 5 of 30 competitors)

CICO 3* (eventing) 
The CICO 3* is the official eventing competition of Germany. It was held as two-day-event. For the first time it was part of the new FEI Nation Cup eventing, it is the fourth competition of this series in 2012.

The first part of this competition, the dressage phase, was held on Friday, July 6, 2012, at 8:30 am. The second phase, the show jumping phase, was held on the same day at 5:30 pm. The final phase, the cross country phase, was held on Saturday, July 7, 2012 at 9:00 am. 

The sponsor of this competition is DHL.

After dressage and show jumping the host team was in the lead, leader in the individual ranking was Laura Collett with her 13-year-old gelding Rayef. In the cross country phase Abraxxas, the horse of German team rider Ingrid Klimke had a run-out (20 penalties). The second place team (Great Britain) also had to accept some faults, British team rider Emily Baldwin had 11,60 time penalties. So the German team win third time in this FEI Nation Cup eventing season.

 Team result CICO 3*

After the CICO Aachen Germany are in the lead in the FEI Nation Cup Eventing with 41 scoring points. Second is the Dutch team with 21 points, third the British and the French team (both 20 points). 

 Individual result CICO 3*

Notes:

Combined individual classification (four-in-hand-driving) 
The combined individual classification was held separated from the team competition. Only the marathon phase was held together with the team competition.

The first part of this competition, the driven dressage, was held on Wednesday, July 4, 2012 at 1:00 pm. The second competition, the obstacle cone driving, was held on Friday, July 6, 2012 at 9:15 pm. The final phase, the marathon, was held on Saturday, July 7, 2012 at 2:00 pm.

(top 10 of 24 competitors)

Best of Champions 
The "Best of Champions" was a show jumping competition with two rounds. The height of the fences was up to 1.50 meters. It was held on Saturday, July 7, 2012 at 8:30 pm.

Since 2011 the best six women and the best six men in the FEI World Ranking have the permission to start in this competition. Also the best placed German men and women in the World Ranking can start in this competition. The first round of this competition was a qualifying round, the best six rider of this round can start in the second round.  The winner was the rider with the lowest number of penalties and the fastest time in the second round.

(Top 5 of 12 Competitors)

Grand Prix Freestyle (dressage) 
The Grand Prix Freestyle (or Grand Prix Kür), also called the "Großer Dressurpreis von Aachen" (Grand dressage price of Aachen) will be the final competition of the CDIO 5* at the 2012 CHIO Aachen. 

A Grand Prix Freestyle is a Freestyle dressage competition. The level of this competition is at least the level of a Grand Prix de Dressage, but it can be higher than the level of a Grand Prix Spécial.

The Grand Prix Freestyle at the CDIO 5* (2012 CHIO Aachen) will be held on Sunday, July 8, 2012 at 10:00 am. The Deutsche Bank is the sponsor of this competition.

(top 5 of 15 competitors)

Nations Cup of Germany (four-in-hand-driving) 
The four-in-hand-driving Nations Cup was the official four-in-hand-driving competition of Germany. 

The first part of this competition, the driven dressage, was held on Thursday, May 5, 2012 at 10:00 am. The second competition, the marathon, was held on Saturday, July 7, 2012 at 2:20 pm. The final phase, the obstacle cone driving, was held on Sunday, July 8, 2012 at 10:00 am. Sixth time in a row the Dutch team win this competition.

(grey penalties points do not count for the team result)

Großer Preis von Aachen (show jumping) 
The "Großer Preis von Aachen", the show jumping Grand Prix of Aachen, was the mayor show jumping competition of the 2012 CHIO Aachen. It was held on Sunday, July 8, 2012 at 2:00 pm. The competition was a show jumping competition with two round and one jump-off, the height of the fences were up to 1.60 meters. The first round of this competition was a qualifying round, the best 18 rider of this round was qualified for the second round. The winner was the rider with the lowest number of penalties and the fastest time in the jump-off.

The main sponsor of the "Großer Preis von Aachen" is Rolex. The Grand Prix was endowed with 350,000 €.

(Top 5 of 40 Competitors)

Sport farewell 
At the first CHIO weekend, Kai Vorberg, one of the most successful vaulter ever say goodbye. With 30 years he ended his career as an active athlete. Now he will be the lunger for other vaulters. He will also support the German vaulting national coach Ulla Ramge.

Television / Live Video 
The German TV stations (WDR, ARD and ZDF) had broadcast more than 16 hours from the 2012 CHIO Aachen, most of them live. Across Europe Eurosport broadcast at two Wednesdays, in total two hour summary programme of the 2012 CHIO Aachen (Show jumping nations cup and show jumping Grand Prix).

Much of the competition are streamed live by the German IPTV-channel ClipMyHorse.

References 

 :de:CHIO Aachen

External links 
 official website
 2012 results
 Live stream of much competitions

CHIO Aachen
CHIO Aachen
CHIO Aachen